Goat Island is an island located between Mt. Pleasant and Isle of Palms, South Carolina, United States, on the Intracoastal Waterway. It is one of the smallest inhabited islands of the region, being only as large as a neighborhood street. There is another Goat Island in Murrells Inlet, South Carolina, that is approximately 20,000 square feet. It is called Goat Island because every spring  Bubba Love (a local celebrity) and a few of his friends place a small number of goats on the islands. Tourists walking along the Marshwalk (a boardwalk that overlooks the marsh) can watch the goats. Goat Island has added peacocks to the population.

Little Goat Island, which is also in between Isle of Palms and Mt Pleasant, has recently been put up for sale by Private Islands Inc. for US$3.5 million. The website states that the island is 390 acres in size but only 25 acres are high enough in elevation to be suitable for development.

Islands of Charleston County, South Carolina
Islands of South Carolina
Coastal islands of South Carolina